The Black Godfather is a 2019 documentary film directed by Reginald Hudlin. The film depicts the story of music executive Clarence Avant, told by the people he worked with.

The film was released by Netflix on June 7, 2019.

Premise
Clarence Avant, known as “the godfather of black music”, is perhaps not well known by the general public, but very famous in the music industry. Starting as a manager to pianist-composer Lalo Schifrin, he later founded record labels, served as concert organizer, a special events producer, a fund-raiser for Democratic politicians, and a mentor to several African American executives.

Cast

Release and reception
The documentary was released on June 7, 2019, on Netflix streaming.

References

External links
 
 
 

2019 documentary films
2019 films
Netflix original documentary films
Boardwalk Pictures films
Documentary films about businesspeople
Films directed by Reginald Hudlin
American documentary films
2010s English-language films
2010s American films
African-American films